Betty Lee Duran (b. in Ozark Mountains, Missouri, United States) was an American writer of romance novels. She started writing as Ruth Jean Dale, and now she writes as Lee Duran.

Ruth Jean Dale's books have been translated into many foreign languages, including French, Spanish, German, Polish, Greek, Italian, Russian and Chinese. She has made frequent appearances on romance best seller lists, and was nominated a "Top Ten Favorite Author" by Affaire de Coeur magazine.

Duran retired temporarily in 2000 after her husband suffered a stroke. After his death in 2008, she returned to writing under her own name: Lee Duran.

Biography
Betty Lee Duran was born in the Ozark Mountains, Missouri. She traveled throughout the U.S. during her childhood. She studied Journalism in her native Missouri. She served in the U.S. Navy, and married a U.S. Marine. She worked as a newspaper reporter in California, with her husband. In 1984, she suffered a brain aneurysm, followed by three brain surgeries.

Duran sold her first novel as Ruth Jean Dale on July 8, 1988. She also collaborated with her friend, the writer Margaret Brownley.  They sold a two-year story projection to the CBS soap, As The World Turns. Duran retired temporarily in 2000 after her husband suffered a stroke. Following his death in 2008, she returned to writing under her own name:  Lee Duran.

Bibliography

As Ruth Jean Dale

Stand alone novels
Extra! Extra! (1989)
Together Again (1990)
One More Chance (1990)
A Million Reasons Why (1992)
Society Page (1995)
The Seven-Year Itch (1996)
One in a Million (1999)
Parents Wanted! (1999)
Fiance Wanted! (2000)

The Taggarts of Texas! Saga
Legend! (1993)
Fireworks! (1992)
The Red-Blooded Yankee! (1992)
Showdown! (1993)
Hitched! (2000)

The Camerons of Colorado Saga
Kids, Critters and Cupid (1996)
The Cupid Conspiracy (1996)
The Cupid Chronicles (1996)
Cupid's Revenge (1998)

Runaway Wedding Series
Runaway Wedding (1996)
A Simple Texas Wedding (1996)
Runaway Honeymoon (1996)

Gone to Texas! Series
The Wrangler's Woman (2000)
Almost a Cowboy (2000)
The Cowgirl's Man (2000)

Rebels & Rogues Series Multi-Author
The Red-Blooded Yankee! (1992)

Back To The Ranch Series Multi-Author
Wild Horses! (1994)

Matchmaking Moms Series Multi-Author
A Royal Pain (1997)

Simply the Best Series Multi-Author
Breakfast in Bed (1997)

Whirlwind Weddings Series Multi-Author
Dash to the Altar (1998)

Hero for Hire Series Multi-Author
A Private Eyeful (1998)

Texas Grooms Wanted! Series Multi-Author
Bachelor Available! (1998)

The Lyon Legacy Series Multi-Author
The Lyon Legacy (1999) (with Peg Sutherland and Roz Denny Fox)
Family Secrets (1999)

Bachelor Auction Series Multi-Author
Shane's Last Stand (2000)

A Walk Down the Aisle: Wedding Celebration Series Multi-Author
Trading Places (2001)

Collections
Something About Ewe / Purrfect Man (2001)

Omnibus in collaboration
Friends, Families, Lovers (1993) (with Kathleen Eagle and Sandra Kitt)
Honeymoon Suite (1995) (with Jennifer Blake, Margaret Brownley and Sheryl Lynn)
Flower Girls (1996) (with Janet Dailey, Beverly Beaver and Margaret Brownley)
Bridal Showers (1998) (with Jule McBride and Kate Hoffmann)
One in a Million / Love, Texas Style (1999) (with Kimberly Raye)

As Lee Duran

Single novels in collaboration 
 Spittin' Image (2001) (with Margaret Brownley)

Single novels 
 Meant For Each Other (2008)

References and sources

External links 
 Ruth Jean Dale Official Website

20th-century American novelists
American romantic fiction writers
Living people
Year of birth missing (living people)
American women novelists
Women romantic fiction writers
20th-century American women writers
21st-century American women